Cynophalla flexuosa is a 2–4 meter high shrub.

Cynophalla flexuosa flowers from early summer to mid summer. The flowers are white to pink, the thin petals are 1.5 cm long. The fruits are green and cylindrical, up to 15 cm long and contain numerous white seeds which are displayed when the ripe fruits splits open. The pulp is bright pink.

Cynophalla flexuosa grows in coastal regions from Florida, the West Indies, Mexico, Central America to South America.

References

External links
 regionalconservation.org

flexuosa